The Vampire Formation is a formation of delta-front siliciclastics deposited in the early Cambrian.  The upper unit is trilobitic Cambrian.  Some authors place the underlying Ingta formation at least partially in the Cambrian; in places it overlies the sub-Cambrian unconformity.

It contains a rich array of trace fossils spanning the pre-trilobitic Cambrian, including some found only there (once interpreted as sponge-like forms); its uppermost strata contain Fallotaspis-zone trilobites, whereas its lower levels come above Protohertzina and Anabarites-bearing shelly layers in the Ingta formation; as such, it spans much of the Fortunian.

References

Cambrian System of North America